Pennsylvania v. Mimms, 434 U.S. 106 (1977), is a United States Supreme Court criminal law decision holding that a police officer ordering a person out of a car following a traffic stop and conducting a pat-down to check for weapons did not violate the Fourth Amendment to the United States Constitution.

Overview 
In 1970, two police officers from the Philadelphia Police Department pulled over a vehicle driven by Harry Mimms for an expired license plate. The officers instructed Mimms to exit the vehicle; when Mimms complied, an officer noticed a bulge in his pants under his jacket, conducted a pat-down, and discovered a weapon. The officer proceeded to arrest Mimms for carrying a concealed deadly weapon and unlawfully carrying a firearm without a license, charges for which Mimms was later convicted. The conviction was reversed by the Pennsylvania Supreme Court (PSC) on March 31, 1975, which ruled that the evidence should have been suppressed as the police violated Mimms' Fourth Amendment rights against unlawful search and seizure. The United States Supreme Court in turn reversed the PSC's reversal, upholding the original conviction on the grounds that no violation of the Fourth Amendment had occurred.

Background 
The Court in Terry v. Ohio stated, "the facts available to the officer at the moment of the seizure or the search 'warrant a man of reasonable caution in the belief' that the action taken was appropriate." Therefore, the officer had the right to arrest Mimms under the charges because he observed the bulge under the jacket.

Conclusion 
The initial ruling favored the police officer in the Court of Common Pleas in Philadelphia. An appeal was brought up to the Pennsylvania Supreme Court, of which ruled in favor of Mimms, and then the ruling was reversed once again by the U.S. Supreme Court. In a 6-3 per curiam ruling, the U.S. Supreme Court decided against Mimms, holding that the order to exit the car was reasonable and thus did not violate the Fourth Amendment.

Ruling 
It was considered common for police officers to ask people inside their vehicle to exit it to prevent any danger that may occur to the officer. It is also much safer to avoid danger from oncoming traffic. Asking Mimms to step out of the car raised little more inconvenience and revealed a little more than what was shown before. Therefore, the bulge that the officer noticed posed as a serious threat to the officer. Anyone with this realization may have conducted a "pat down". The Decision of Pennsylvania Supreme Court was reversed.

Appeal of Pennsylvania 
The Petitioner of Pennsylvania sought the judgment of the Supreme Court of Pennsylvania to reverse the conviction in favor of Mimms for carrying a firearm and deadly weapon without a license. The court reversed the ruling because the "revolver was seized in a manner which violated the Fourth Amendment to the Constitution of the United States." Because the Supreme Court disagreed with the following ruling, they granted the Commonwealth's petition for certiorari and the judgment of the Supreme Court of Pennsylvania was reversed.

Facts before the Supreme Court 
While on patrol in the city of Philadelphia, two officers discovered Harry Mimms on the road, driving a vehicle with an expired license plate. The two officers pulled the vehicle over to issue the ticket. One of the two officers stepped out of the car and proceeded to walk towards the vehicle whereupon he asked Mimms to exit the vehicle and show his driver's license and registration. He also asked if Mimms had a weapon in his vehicle. To assess the situation, the officer frisked and searched Mimms and discovered a loaded .38-caliber handgun. The passenger who was with Mimms was also found with a .32-caliber weapon. The officer proceeded to arrest Mimms on the charge that he was carrying a concealed deadly weapon without a license. The motion to suppress the revolver was denied, and at trial he was convicted of both counts.

The Pennsylvania Supreme Court reversed the lower court holding that the revolver should have been suppressed as it had been discovered in violation of the Fourth and Fourteenth Amendments. The Pennsylvania Supreme Court saw no problem in the actions that involved pulling the car over and stated that due to the observation of the bulge under the respondent's coat that the search was permissible. However, the fact that the officer asked the defendant to exit the vehicle created a forbidden "seizure." Absent Mimms' exiting the vehicle, the officer would have had no grounds for reasonable suspicion, the necessary standard under Terry v. Ohio, 392 U.S. 1 (1968). Because the gun was discovered by the unconstitutional action, it should have been suppressed.

Opinion

Majority opinion 
The Court stated "the reasonableness in all the circumstances of the particular governmental invasion of a citizens personal security [...] The reasonableness depends... on a balance between the public interest and the individual's rights to personal security free from arbitrary interference by law officers." Unlike in Terry v. Ohio, the initial "violation" of freedom was permissible because the driver was driving with an expired license plate in violation of the Pennsylvania Department of Motor Vehicles Code. The only thing to decide, besides the “pat down,” is whether the initial authorization by the officer to tell the respondent to exit the vehicle was allowed under the Fourth Amendment. Therefore, the court must focus on the violation resulting from the officer telling the respondent to exit the vehicle once it was legally stopped.

The state of Pennsylvania believes that the officer had no evidence to be suspicious of Mimms during the stop whether it was his behavior or unusual activity; nothing was evident during the patrol. The state discovered that the officer, during every routine traffic stop, ordered the drivers to exit their vehicles. The state defends the officer, saying that this practice was used to prevent anything from happening to the officer and that it could have been reasonable under those circumstances. Being in front of the officer makes it impossible to have something suspicious go unseen if the driver were to attempt something to harm the officer.

There is a huge risk for officers confronting a man seated in his vehicle on a routine traffic stop. "According to a study, approximately 30% of police shootings occurred when a police officer approached a suspect seated in an automobile." However one cannot assume that traffic violations are more dangerous than other various confrontations.

Another reason for making the action taken by the officer to ask the respondent to exit the vehicle more acceptable, was that it could prevent an accidental mishap from oncoming cars. Instead of discussing the issue while standing on the road, the officer may ask the driver to exit the car and move off to the side of the road for further discussion. Now the question at hand is whether there was an intrusion in the personal liberty of the driver after the order to get out of the vehicle. The conclusion was that it was de minimis (low level of risk). The officer has already decided that the driver is to be detained for the traffic summons, now it is whether they should converse while the driver is sitting in the car or standing alongside it. The action to step out of the car is merely for the officers’ safety and is not a serious infraction in the liberty of the driver.

The case of Terry v. Ohio stated that "the facts available to the officer at the moment of the seizure or the search ‘warrant a man of reasonable caution in the belief that the action taken was appropriate." Since the action the officer took to tell the driver to exit the vehicle was justified, then the observation of the bulge in the drivers’ jacket was thought to present danger to the officer and therefore he had "reasonable caution" to have conducted the "pat down."

The Supreme Court reversed the Ruling by the Supreme Court of Pennsylvania.

Dissenting opinions 
Justice Thurgood Marshall wrote a dissenting opinion, stating that the "frisk" that the officer proceeded to do to Mimms could only be permissible under the Fourth Amendment if the search was the reason for the stop. The reason Mimms was pulled over was due to an expired licensed plate, which in no way has to do with carrying a concealed weapon.

Justices John Paul Stevens and William Brennan wrote a different dissent, stating that the court gave too much leeway in allowing the officers to search the defendant for any reason of concern.

See also 
 Exclusionary rule
 Motor vehicle exception
 Terry stop

References

External links 
 

1977 in United States case law
United States Supreme Court cases
United States Fourth Amendment case law
United States Supreme Court cases of the Burger Court
Legal history of Pennsylvania
Philadelphia Police Department